Dean Kukan (born 8 July 1993) is a Swiss professional ice hockey defenceman currently playing with the ZSC Lions of the National League (NL). He is of Czech descent.

Playing career
Kukan played in the 2006 Quebec International Pee-Wee Hockey Tournament with a youth team from Zürich. Undrafted, he made his European Elite debut during the 2010–11 season playing in the Swiss National League A with the ZSC Lions. After two seasons, Kukan left for Luleå HF in the Swedish Hockey League (SHL).

Kukan established a role on the blueline with Luleå HF over six seasons before using an NHL out-clause after the 2014–15 season, to sign a two-year entry-level contract with the Columbus Blue Jackets on 1 June 2015.

In the 2015–16 season, Kukan made his NHL debut on 26 March 2016, against the Nashville Predators at the Bridgestone Arena. He was reassigned to their AHL affiliate at the end of the Blue Jackets season and went on to win the 2016 Calder Cup.

On June 9, 2017, the Blue Jackets re-signed Kukan to a one-year, two-way extension. On February 7, 2020, Kukan was signed to a two-year contract extension by the Blue Jackets.

International play

Kukan participated at the 2012 World Junior Ice Hockey Championships as a member of the Switzerland men's national junior ice hockey team.

Career statistics

Regular season and playoffs

International

Awards and honors

References

External links

1993 births
Living people
Swiss people of Czech descent
Swiss ice hockey defencemen
Asplöven HC players
Cleveland Monsters players
Columbus Blue Jackets players
Swiss expatriate ice hockey people
GCK Lions players
Lake Erie Monsters players
Luleå HF players
Swiss expatriate sportspeople in Sweden
Swiss expatriate sportspeople in the United States
Tingsryds AIF players
Undrafted National Hockey League players
ZSC Lions players
People from Uster District
Sportspeople from the canton of Zürich